Senator Frank may refer to:

Kurt Frank (born 1945), Wisconsin State Senate
Pat Collier Frank (born 1929), Florida State Senate
Harry F. Franke Jr. (1922–2012), Wisconsin State Senate